GLHS may refer to:
 Shelby GLHS, an automobile
 Greater Lafayette Health Services, now Franciscan Health, in Lafayette, Indiana, United States

Schools 
 Gordon Lee High School, Chickamauga, Georgia, United States
 Governor Livingston High School, Berkeley Heights, New Jersey, United States
 Grass Lake High School, Grass Lake, Michigan, United States
Gahanna Lincoln High School, Gahanna, Ohio, United States